Baboucarr is a Gambian masculine given name. Notable people with the name include:

Baboucarr Gaye (born 1998), Gambian football goalkeeper
Baboucarr Njie (born 1995), Gambian footballer 
Baboucarr-Blaise Jagne (born 1955), foreign minister of the Gambia

African masculine given names